The Order of the Volta is an order of merit from the Republic of Ghana. It was instituted in 1960 and is awarded to people for their outstanding service to the country.

Grades 
There are three grades with a civil and military division each:
 Companion (CV) - Civil Division, Military Division, Honorary Division
 Officer (OV) - Civil Division, Military Division, Honorary Division
 Member (MV) - Civil Division, Military Division, Police Division, Honorary Division

The ribbon bar of the order is navy blue with red borders and a central black stripe.

Recipients
Companions (CV)

 Valentina Tereshkova (1964)
 Azzu Mate Kole II (1969)
 Bawa Andani Yakubu (1969)
 Samuel Azu Crabbe (1977)
 Kwabena Darko (1978)
 Robert K. A. Gardiner (1978)
 George Commey Mills-Odoi (1978)
 Fred Kwasi Apaloo (1979)
 Robert Patrick Baffour (1979)
 V. C. R. A. C. Crabbe (1979)
 Abedi Pele (1996)
Mary Grant (1997)
 Kofi Bentum Quantson (1997)
 Joseph Henry Smith (2001)
 James Aggrey-Orleans (2006)
 Emmanuel Quaye Archampong (2006)
 Joyce Aryee (2006)
 Melody Millicent Danquah (2006)
 Francis Lodonu (2006)
 Ivan Addae Mensah (2006)
 Patrick Awuah Jr. (2007)
 Charles Agyin-Asare (2007)
Paul Victor Obeng (P. V. Obeng) (2007)
 Atukwei Okai (2007)
 Mensa Otabil (2007)
 Fred Amugi (2008)
 Sam Korankye Ankrah (2008)
 Grace Bediako (2008)
 Bert Koenders (2008)
 Kwaku Sakyi-Addo (2008)
 Roland Issifu Alhassan (2008)
 Clifford Nii Boi Tagoe (2008)
 Francis Allotey (2009)
 Kwaku Ohene-Frempong (2010)
 A. K. B. Ampiah (2011)
 Bridget Katsriku (2011)
 Harry Sawyerr (2011)
Jane Naana Opoku-Agyemang (2011) 
 Prince Al-Waleed bin Talal bin Abdulaziz al Saud (2015)
 Agnes Aggrey-Orleans (2015)
 Kwabena Duffuor (2015)
 Joshua Alabi (2016)
 Commodore Stephen Obimpeh (2016)
 Kofi Totobi Quakyi (2016)
 Alhaji Iddrisu Huudu (2016)
 Dr Kwabena Adjei (2016)
 Vice Admiral Matthew Quashie (2016) 
 Major General Richard Kwame Opoku-Adusei (2016)
 Rear-Admiral Geoffrey Mawuli Biekro (2016)

Various

Kwame Addo Kufour
Marian Ewurama Addy
Peter Ala Adjetey
Nana Addo Danquah Akufo-Addo
Gladys Asmah
Kwadwo Baah-Wiredu
James Barnor
Aida Desta
Ablade Glover
Enoch Teye Mensah
Paa Kwesi Nduom
Hackman Owusu-Agyeman
Nathan Quao
Frank Gibbs Torto

See also 

 Orders, decorations, and medals of Ghana

References 

Volta
Awards established in 1960
1960 establishments in Ghana